The wels catfish  ( or ; Silurus glanis), also called sheatfish or just wels, is a large species of catfish native to wide areas of central, southern, and eastern Europe, in the basins of the Baltic, Black and Caspian Seas. It has been introduced to Western Europe as a prized sport fish and is now found from the United Kingdom east to Kazakhstan and China and south to Greece and Turkey.

Etymology
The English common name comes from Wels, the common name of the species in German language. Wels is a variation of Old High German wal, from Proto-Germanic *hwalaz – the same source as for whale – from Proto-Indo-European *(s)kʷálos ('sheatfish').

Description
The wels catfish's mouth contains lines of numerous small teeth, two long barbels on the upper jaw and four shorter barbels on the lower jaw. It has a long anal fin that extends to the caudal fin, and a small sharp dorsal fin relatively far forward. The wels relies largely on hearing and smell for hunting prey (owing to its sensitive Weberian apparatus and chemoreceptors), although like many other catfish, the species exhibits a tapetum lucidum, providing its eyes with a degree of sensitivity at night, when the species is most active. With its sharp pectoral fins, it creates an eddy to disorient its victim, which the predator sucks into its mouth and swallows whole. The skin is very slimy. Skin colour varies with environment. Clear water will give the fish a black color, while muddy water will often tend to produce green-brown specimens. The underside is always pale yellow to white in colour. Albinistic specimens are known to exist and are caught occasionally. With an elongated body-shape, wels are able to swim backwards like eels.

The female produces up to 30,000 eggs per kilogram of body weight. The male guards the nest until the brood hatches, which, depending on water temperature, can take from three to ten days. If the water level decreases too much or too fast the male has been observed to splash the eggs with its tail in order to keep them wet.

The wels catfish is a long-lived species, with a specimen of 70 years old having been captured during a recent study in Sweden.

Size
Such lengths are rare and unproven during the last century, but there is a somewhat credible report from the 19th century of a wels catfish of this size. (According to the Hungarian naturalist Ottó Hermann [1835-1914], catfish of 300–400 kilograms were also caught in Hungary in the old centuries from the Tisza river.)

At  they can weigh  and at  they can weigh .

Greek wels grow well thanks to the mild climate, lack of competition, and good food supply.

Wels catfish have also been observed thriving in the cooling ponds of the damaged Chernobyl Nuclear Power Plant. Although popularly believed to have been mutated into large sizes as a result of radioactive fallout, in reality the fish are growing to such proportions due to the absence of hunting and fishing, which have been outlawed in the exclusion zone following the accident, and being fed by tourists visiting the area.

A report in the Austrian newspaper Der Standard on 5 August 2009, mentions a wels catfish dragging a fisherman near Győr, Hungary, under water by his right leg after he attempted to grab the fish in a hold.

Diet

Like most freshwater bottom feeders, the wels catfish lives on annelid worms, gastropods, insects, crustaceans and fish. Larger specimens have also been observed to eat frogs, snakes, rats, voles, coypu and aquatic birds such as ducks, even cannibalising on other catfish. A study published by researchers at the University of Toulouse, France, in 2012 documented individuals of this species in an introduced environment lunging out of the water to feed on pigeons on land. Out of the beaching behaviour observed and filmed in this study, 28% were successful in bird capture. Stable isotope analyses of catfish stomach contents using carbon 13 and nitrogen 15 revealed a highly variable dietary composition of terrestrial birds. This is likely the result of adapting their behaviour to forage on novel prey in response to new environments upon its introduction to the river Tarn in 1983 since this type of behaviour has not been reported within the native range of this species. They can also eat red worms in the fall, but only the river species.

The wels catfish has also been observed taking advantage of large die-offs of Asian clams to feed on the dead clams at the surface of the water during the daytime. This opportunistic feeding highlights the adaptability of the wels catfish to new food sources, since the species is mainly a nocturnal bottom-feeder.

Distribution and ecology
The wels catfish lives in large, warm lakes and deep, slow-flowing rivers. It prefers to remain in sheltered locations such as holes in the riverbed, sunken trees, etc. It consumes its food in the open water or in the deep, where it can be recognized by its large mouth. Wels catfish are kept in fish ponds as food fish.

An unusual habitat for the species exists inside the Chernobyl exclusion zone, where a small population lives in abandoned cooling ponds and channels at a close distance to the decommissioned power plant. These catfish appear healthy, and are maintaining a position as top predators in the aquatic ecosystem of the immediate area.

As introduced species
There are concerns about the ecological impact of introducing the wels catfish to regions where it is not native.  Following the introduction of wels catfish, populations of other fish species have undergone steep declines. Since its introduction in the Mequinenza Reservoir in 1974, it has spread to other parts of the Ebro basin, including its tributaries, especially the Segre River. Some endemic species of Iberian barbels, genus Barbus in the Cyprinidae that were once abundant, especially in the Ebro river, have disappeared due to competition with and predation by wels catfish. The ecology of the river has also changed, with a major growth in aquatic vegetation such as algae.

The wels catfish may have established a population in Santa Catarina, Brazil. They were imported from Hungary in 1988 and were washed into the Itajaí-Açu river after a flood caused their tanks to overflow. In 2006, a specimen weighing 86 kg (189.5 lbs) and 1.85 m (6 ft) long was captured in Blumenau, suggesting the catfish have survived and possibly be reproducing.

Conservation status 
Although Silurus glanis is not considered globally endangered, the conservation status varies across the species native distribution range. In the northern periphery of the distribution, the species has been declining over the last centuries and was extinct from Denmark in the 1700s and from Finland in the 1800s. In Sweden it persists only in a few lakes and rivers, and is now considered as near threatened. Recent genetic studies have furthermore found that the Swedish populations harbors low genetic diversity and are genetically isolated and differentiated from each other, highlighting the need for conservation attention.

As food 
Only the flesh of young wels catfish specimens is valued as food. It is palatable when the fish weighs less than 15 kg (33 lb). Larger than this size, the fish is highly fatty and additionally can be loaded with toxic contaminants through bioaccumulation due to its position at the top of the food chain. Large specimens are not recommended for consumption, but are sought out as sport fish due to their combativeness.

Attacks on people 

Tabloids regularly report attacks caused by various catfish that primarily affected animals (often only the role of the catfish was presumed). In April 2009, an Austrian fisherman was allegedly attacked by a catfish in one of the fishing lakes in Pér, near Győr, Hungary. However, the man reportedly managed to break free.

Similar stories occur in the works of older natural history writers. Alfred Brehm (1829–1884), a German naturalist, published his famous work The World of Animals in the 19th century. It was also translated into Hungarian at the beginning of the 20th century. In this, Brehm or the compiling Hungarian scientists write the following: 
"Old Gesner’s (Conrad Gessner Swiss naturalist, 1516–1565) claim that catfish doesn’t spare humans either doesn’t just belong in the realm of tales, as we know of several cases that confirm that. Thus, Heckel and Kner mention that a catfish was caught at Bratislava, in the stomach of which the remains of a child corpse were found. [...] Fishermen credible to Antipa (probably Romanian zoologist Grigore Antipa, 1866–1949) told me that children bathing in the stomachs of catfish were caught in the bones of their hands and feet. - Communicates Vutskits (probably Hungarian zoologist :hu:Vutskits György, 1858–1929). - A Romanian fisherman penetrated the middle of the Danube with his boat because he wanted to take a bath. While bathing, a catfish caught his legs, which he could no longer pull out of the mouth of this big-mouthed monster, and so he got to the bottom of the water. A few days later, they came across the corpse of a dead fisherman whose legs were still in the catfish's mouth, but even the greedy robber could not release his victim's legs and drowned because of it".

Related species 
 Aristotle's catfish (Silurus aristotelis) from Greece, the only other native European catfish species beside Silurus glanis.
 Amur catfish (Silurus asotus), introduced to European rivers
 Giant Lake Biwa catfish (Silurus biwaensis) from Japan endemic to Lake Biwa.
 Soldatov's catfish (Silurus soldatovi) from the Amur River, Russia

References

Further reading

External links

This article includes information translated out of the German and French Wikipedias.

Silurus
Catfish of Europe
Fish described in 1758
Taxa named by Carl Linnaeus
Articles containing video clips